Pamber Forest and Silchester Common is a  biological Site of Special Scientific Interest in Tadley in Hampshire. Pamber Forest and Upper Inhams Copse is managed by the Hampshire and Isle of Wight Wildlife Trust and  Pamber Forest is a Local Nature Reserve.

Pamber Forest has hazel coppice dominated by oak standards. At the southern end are plants associated with ancient woodland, such as orpine, wood horsetail, lily of the valley, wild daffodil and the rare mountain fern. The woodland has over forty nationally rare or uncommon species.

References

 

Local Nature Reserves in Hampshire
Hampshire and Isle of Wight Wildlife Trust
Sites of Special Scientific Interest in Hampshire